Zionist antisemitism is the phenomenon in which individuals, groups, or governments support the Zionist movement and the State of Israel while they simultaneously hold antisemitic views about Jews. In some cases, Zionism may be promoted for explicitly antisemitic reasons. The prevalence of antisemitism has been widely noted within the Christian Zionist movement, whose adherents may hold antisemitic and supersessionist beliefs about Jews while they also support Zionism for eschatological reasons. Antisemitic right-wing nationalists, particularly in Europe and the United States, sometimes support the Zionist movement because they wish that Jews be expelled or that they emigrate to Israel. The Israeli government's alleged collaboration with antisemitic politicians abroad has been criticized as an example of Zionist antisemitism. Anti-Zionists have criticized the Zionist movement for its alleged complicity with or its alleged capitulation to antisemitism since its inception, with some anti-Zionists also referring to Zionism as a form of antisemitism.

Allegations of antisemitism within Zionism
According to the anti-imperialist Jewish-American academic Amy Kaplan, writing in the blog Mondoweiss, Jewish history "shows that anti-Semitism and pro-Zionism have never been mutually exclusive". Kaplan says that Zionist advocates "for a Jewish state enlisted stereotypes of Jewswittingly or notto further their cause." She lists Theodor Herzl as an early Zionist who appealed to antisemitic European leaders who believed that the "Jewish Question" would be solved by sending European Jews to Palestine. Writing for International Socialist Review, Annie Levin argues that the writings of Theodor Herzl, Max Nordau, and other European Zionists were "littered with descriptions of European Jews as parasites, social diseases, germs, aliens"...and she also argues that these antisemitic views "flowed quite logically from Zionism's basic assumptions about Jews. Zionists accepted the 19th century view that anti-Semitism–in fact all racial difference–was a permanent feature of human nature. For this reason it was pointless to struggle against it." Levin said that Jews have often been "hostile to Zionism" because the movement "called for a retreat from the struggle against anti-Semitism." Writing for Jacobin, [[Sarah Levy {Jacobin writer)|]] says that early Zionists "partnered with a rabidly antisemitic British ruling class to secure funding for their colonial project in Palestine" while they also aided British attempts to "defeat left-wing 'International Jews' (such as Karl Marx, Leon Trotsky, Béla Kun, Rosa Luxemburg and Emma Goldman, among others)" because "Churchill understood that revolutionary socialists, organizing against racist pogroms in their own countries, posed a threat to the ruling class's need to divide and rule its population, and so understood the benefit to supporting a 'Jewish movement' that could counter this logic of antiracism and internationalism."

According to the political theorist Michael Walzer, early Jewish anti-Zionists in the 19th-century were often Orthodox Jews who believed that Zionism was a heretical ideology. These Orthodox Jews believed that the return of Jews to Eretz Israel and the establishment of a state would only occur after the Messiah came. Until the arrival of the Messiah, Orthodox Jews believed that Jews must accept living in diaspora and defer to non-Jewish rulers while waiting for redemption. Zionists, who were usually secular, despised the perceived passivity of Orthodox Jews to the point that they were often referred to as antisemites by Orthodox anti-Zionists.

The Austrian-Jewish anti-Zionist writer Karl Kraus attacked Zionism in general and in his book Eine Krone für Zion (A Crown for Zion), he attacked Herzl in particular, said that antisemitism is the essence of the Zionist movement. Kraus referred to Zionist aims as antisemitic and he also called Zionists "Jewish antisemites", asserting that "Aryan antisemites" and Zionist Jewish antisemites share the same goal of expelling Jews from European culture.

Steven M. Cohen, sociologist at the Hebrew Union College-Jewish Institute of Religion, said that the correlation between anti-Zionism and antisemitism is weak, with all combinations of the pro- and anti-Zionist and antisemitist positions being possible. Todd Gitlin, sociologist at Columbia University, said that right-wing Zionism and antisemitism "have the same soul...they rhyme" because both are variants of ultra-nationalism.

Joseph Massad, a Palestinian academic at Columbia University, stated that "It is Israel's claims that it represents and speaks for all Jews that are the most anti-Semitic claims of all." Massad said that "Jewish opponents of Zionism" understood that gentile Europeans "shared the precepts of anti-Semitism" and that Zionists and antisemites held a shared belief in "the expulsion of Jews from Europe." Massad said that most pre-War European Jews resisted the "anti-Semitic basis of Zionism", while European countries typically supported "the anti-Semitic programme of Zionism".

Europe

Israel
Rabbi Baruch Meir Klein, President of the New York Board of Rabbis, said that the "Goyyim in America let us be Jews. They do not ruin our Talmud Torah. They do not reform our schools...They do not ridicule Jews who go to Mikveh or Kloppen Hoyshaness...It is enough for me to be in Galuth with Goyyim. I have no need to be [in Eretz Israel], in Galuth under Jews who are antisemitic Zionists."

Atalia Omer wrote that in Israel "young activists increasingly recognize that their safety depends on linking the fight against antisemitism to other social justice struggles", mentioning the Israeli activists who have "taken to the streets to protest Netanyahu’s regime and many others such as B'Tselem for years have decried the weaponization of antisemitism." Omer said that these "critical voices are silenced within the entrenched ideological regime that the IHRA represents as it coalesces with white nationalist and Christian Zionist antisemitism."

United States

Right-wing evangelical Christians in the United States are often vocally Zionist while also holding antisemitic attitudes towards Jews. Conservative Christians are amongst the strongest supporters of the State of Israel in the United States. With 7.1 million members, Christians United for Israel (CUFI) is the largest Zionist organization in the United States. Many Christian Zionists believe that the Gathering of Israel is a prerequisite for the final coming of the Christian messiah, after which a portion of Jews will convert and the majority of Jews will be killed and condemned to Hell. Ben Lorber and Aidan Orly, writing in Religion Dispatches, have described Christian Zionism as "one of the largest antisemitic movements in the world today". Ha'aretz writer Joshua Shanes condemned CUFI founder John Hagee for promoting an "apocalyptic and deeply antisemitic worldview" and promoting some of the "most dangerous myths of the modern era." Hagee has promoted financial conspiracy theories about the Rothschild family controlling the federal reserve, said that Hitler was sent by God to murder Jews who refused to emigrate to Israel, and described the Antichrist as a "half-Jew homosexual." Slavoj Žižek has also described John Hagee, as well as Glenn Beck, as examples of Christian fundamentalist "anti-Semitic Zionists." Žižek said that Zionism itself has "paradoxically become anti-Semitic" because the movement promotes hatred of anti-Zionist Jews by constructing a figure of Jewish anti-Zionism "along anti-Semitic lines." Žižek describes the way that Jewish anti-Zionists are maligned as "Self-hating Jews" by Zionists as an example of Zionist antisemitism.

Zionist leaders and organizations in the United States have been widely criticized, particularly by the Jewish left, for allegedly downplaying the severity of antisemitism in the United States and for alleged complicity with the Trump administration in order to pursue pro-Israel, Zionist causes. Atalia Omer, a professor of religion at the University of Notre Dame, has written that "Israel's silence on white nationalism and its implicit or explicit condoning of antisemitic Zionists" has decisively convinced many American Jews that the Israeli government is not keeping Jews safe and is actively endangering Jews living in the diaspora. Omer cites the "moral shock" of Israeli silence on white nationalist antisemitism for discrediting the "Zionist monopoly over the narrative of Jewish survival." Sarah Levy criticized Morton Klein, president of the Zionist Organization of America (ZOA), in Jacobin magazine for being "notably silent" about antisemitism during the Trump era. ZOA was deluged by messages from outraged supporters following ZOA's support for Steve Bannon and Klein's statement that he could not be an antisemite because "He's the opposite of an antisemite. He's a philo-semite." +972 Magazine's Natasha Roth-Rowland said that a "rise of Zionist antisemitism as a standard behavior among large swaths of the GOP and its ecosystem has become a defining feature of the American far right’s worldview and modus operandi."

In 2017, Judith Butler denounced antisemitic manifestations of Zionism within the Trump administration. Butler wrote that Bannon is both a "strong Zionist" and that "his antisemitism apparently does not get in the way of his support for the Israeli state, and that his supporters in the Israeli government do not seem to mind." Butler argued that right-wing antisemitic Zionism is a manifestation of white supremacy, whereby the white Ashkenazi ruling class in Israel makes alliances with right-wing politicians in other countries on the basis of shared anti-Arab racism, anti-Palestinianism, and Islamophobia.

In 2019, the Russian-born Jewish-American journalist Masha Gessen described Donald Trump as a "pro-Zionist anti-Semite". Gessen noted that Trump's administration had pursued pro-Israel policies while also spreading Jewish stereotypes, such as the speech Trump delivered at the Israeli American Council National Summit where he declared that "A lot of you are in the real estate business because I know you very well...You’re brutal killers, not nice people at all." Calling Trump's comments "plain, easily recognizable anti-Semitism", Gessen said that Trump views American Jews as "alien beings whom he associates with the state of Israel."

The liberal journalist Peter Beinart said that Zionist antisemitism is likely on the rise in the United States and that it is unclear that Zionists are less likely to harbor antisemitic sentiments compared to anti-Zionists. According to Beinart, "It is easy to find antisemitism among people who, far from opposing Zionism, enthusiastically embrace it."

During the January 6 United States Capitol attack in 2021, several insurrectionists waved Israeli flags. In this context, organizations including the Adalah Justice Project, Jewish Voice for Peace, and Students for Justice in Palestine made social media posts suggesting a link between Zionist ideology and antisemitic right-wing extremism. The Anti-Defamation League describes these comments as part of an emerging effort among anti-Israel activists to associate "the Israeli flag with white supremacy, racism, settler-colonialism, violence and more". The ADL disputes this association and notes that the organizations promoting the link did not mention the wide variety of other flags present at the Capitol attack, including those of Canada, Cuba, Georgia, India, South Korea, and the former state of South Vietnam.

Austin Ahlman of The Intercept said that Zionist organization Democratic Majority for Israel (DMFI) employed antisemitic tropes during the 2020 election after DMFI released attack ads criticizing the progressive Jewish California politician Sara Jacobs. The ads emphasized Jacobs' wealthy background, portraying her "fortune and privileged life" as making her out of touch with ordinary Americans. The Intercept said that the "imagery and language employed by many of the ads are reminiscent of common antisemitic tropes", noting that DMFI had previously endorsed wealthy non-Jewish candidates. Rachel Rosen, a DMFI spokesperson, denied accusations that the ads were antisemitic.

In August 2022, the left-wing Jewish organization IfNotNow tweeted that AIPAC was antisemitism after AIPAC said that "George Soros has a long history of backing anti-Israel groups" and that "J Street & Soros work to undermine" pro-Israel Democrats. IfNotNow tweeted that AIPAC was not a Jewish organization, did not represent Jews, and in allegedly promoting antisemitic conspiracy theories about Soros, AIPAC had become part of the "antisemitic far right."

Among white nationalists
The historian David N. Myers has wrote that "Leading white nationalists such as Richard Spencer and Jared Taylor liken their movement to Zionism, seeing it as a model for the kind of monoethnic purity they favor in [the United States]." Myers states that the "combination of pro-Israel and antisemitic sensibilities" is common within American politics due to the combined influences of the "Christian evangelical Right with its end-game theology", "archly conservative" Catholics, and the political ideology of Donald Trump. Atalia Omer noted "convergences between white supremacist violence and exclusionary politics which often comes in the form of Zionist antisemitism", citing Richard Spencer's "white Zionism" as an example.

The Norwegian far-right domestic terrorist Anders Behring Breivik is both an antisemitic neo-Nazi and a strong supporter of the State of Israel. The Slovenian philosopher Slavoj Žižek described Breivik's ideology as an "extreme version" of "Zionist anti-Semitism", writing that Breivik is "antisemitic, but pro-Israel" because in Breivik's view the Israeli state is a "first line of defense against Muslim expansion". Žižek notes that Breivik believes that France and the United Kingdom have a "Jewish problem" due to their large Jewish populations, whereas the rest of Western Europe doesn't, describing this as Breivik's belief that "Jews are OK as long as there aren't too many of them" living in diaspora. Journalist Michelle Goldberg referred to Breivik as an "ardent Zionist" who "has nothing but contempt for the majority of Jewish people", arguing that his "embrace of Israel...far from being unique, is just the latest sign" that "in European politics, fascism and an aggressive sort of Zionism increasingly go together." Goldberg cites Islamophobia as a commonality between the State of Israel and "European white nationalists".

Ben Lorber, writing for +972 Magazine, argued that American white nationalist support for the "Jewish state's supremacist values fits comfortably with its deep antisemitism" and that "philosemitic Christian Zionism carries deep undercurrents of anti-Judaism." Lorber refers to the phenomenon of right-Zionism fitting "comfortably alongside simmering currents of antisemitism" as "Antisemitic Zionism".

Zionism as expulsion
Richard S. Levy, a scholar of antisemitism, wrote that "Antisemites certainly found Zionism useful" because Zionism provided "antisemitic Zionists" with a justification as to why Jewish people who were living in the diaspora should be expelled from the societies which they had lived in for centuries. Coerced emigration to Zion appealed to antisemites because it provided them with a "solution to the Jewish question".

Edwin Montagu, an ardent anti-Zionist and the sole Jewish member of the British Cabinet, was "passionately opposed to the [Balfour] declaration on the grounds that...it was a capitulation to anti-Semitic bigotry, with its suggestion that Palestine was the natural destination of the Jews..." Writer Bari Weiss has highlights Arthur Balfour as an example of a historical antisemitic Zionism. Though Balfour set Jewish return to Israel as British government policy, he did so because he did not want Jews emigrating from Eastern European on account of pogroms to travel to Britain. Weiss gives as example of his opposition to Jewish immigration his support of the 1905 British immigration restriction on Jews.

The Polish government of the 1930s supported Jewish immigration to Israel for reasons similar to Balfour. The Polish government during this period was a staunch supporter of the Zionist movement, while also adopting increasingly antisemitic domestic policies. The Polish government actively encouraged emigration to Mandatory Palestine because it decreased the population of Polish Jews. Historian Emanuel Melzer wrote that the Polish government's attitudes towards Zionism and Jewish emigration "implied that Jews were superfluous, alien, and even a destructive element" and that this attitude "might have had its repercussions on a part of the Polish population's attitude towards the Jews during the war", but acknowledges that the Shoah itself was not caused by the intensification of Polish antisemitism between 1936 and 1939. During the 1920s and 1930s, the General Jewish Labour Bund in Poland was vocally critical of this antisemitic Zionism. The Bund produced election campaign materials including the terms "antisemitic Zionists" and "Zionist antisemites", arguing that the Zionist promotion of emigration and cooperation with the Polish government strengthened antisemitic forces within Polish society.

The French-Jewish journalist Alain Gresh noted that the antisemitic right-wing politician and Nazi collaborator Xavier Vallat said that "Jews would never integrate into France and that they had to go to Israel."

See also

References

External links
 
 
Yakov M. Rabkin, Antisemitism in Zionism and in Israel, Outlook (Vancouver), 2004 (42, 3), pp. 17-18.
Slavoj Zizek, Zionist Anti-Semitism, YouTube
Zionism and Anti-Semitism: Racist Political Twins (J-BIG Briefing), Ireland Palestine Solidarity Campaign

Further reading
  Also reproduced in 

Anti-Arabism
Antisemitism in Europe
Antisemitism in Israel
Antisemitism in the United States
Christian Zionism
Definition of antisemitism controversy
Islamophobia
Late modern Christian antisemitism
Philosemitism
Racial antisemitism
Right-wing antisemitism
Right-wing populism
White supremacy
Xenophobia in Europe
Xenophobia in North America
Zionism